Zidane most commonly refers to the name of Arab origin, Zaydān, meaning increase.

"Zidane", also of Kabyle (Algerian Amazigh) origin, meaning "the delightful" or "delightful".

Zidane may also refer to:

 Djamel Zidane (born 1955), former Algerian footballer
 Luca Zidane (born 1998), French footballer and son of Zinedine Zidane
 Mohamed Amine Zidane (born 1983), Algerian footballer
 Mohamed Zidan (born 1981), Egyptian footballer
 Mohamed Zidan (rower) (born 1978), Egyptian rower
 Youssef Ziedan (born 1958), Egyptian scholar
 Zidane Tribal, the main character of the video game Final Fantasy IX
 Zinedine Zidane (born 1972), former French footballer of Algerian descent
 Zidane: A 21st Century Portrait, a documentary about him
 Zinedine Zidane (song), song by Australian band Vaudeville Smash
 Zidaan Ahmed, Character The New Adventures At Shooters Hill College/ The CC Show

See also
 
 Zidan (disambiguation)
 Zidani (disambiguation)

Surnames of Algerian origin
Arabic-language surnames
Arabic masculine given names